Roghudi (or ) is a comune (municipality) in the Metropolitan City of Reggio Calabria in the Italian region Calabria, located about  southwest of Catanzaro and about  southeast of Reggio Calabria.

Roghudi Nuovo was founded in 1973 after two consecutive floods had made Roghudi Vecchio uninhabitable.

Roghudi is one of the places where the Greek–Calabrian dialect is still spoken, this being a remnant of the ancient Greek colonisation of Magna Graecia in Southern Italy and Sicily.

References

External links
 Official website

Cities and towns in Calabria